Mohammad Al Saleh is a Lebanese singer of Palestinian origin. In 2017 he released his first single, "Tayoubi".

Discography

Singles
 Tayoubi (2017)

References

External links
 

People from Sidon
Palestinian male singers
21st-century Lebanese male singers
Lebanese people of Palestinian descent
Living people
Contestants from Arabic singing competitions
Year of birth missing (living people)